Wola-Chojnata  is a village in the administrative district of Gmina Biała Rawska, within Rawa County, Łódź Voivodeship, in central Poland.

The village has a population of 450.

References

Wola-Chojnata